This is a list of renamed places in Romania.

Background 
During the twentieth century, a number of places in Romania had their names changed for various reasons. For instance, Brașov was called Orașul Stalin by the Communist regime in order to pay homage to the Soviet leader. Some of those names were changed back to the original; Brașov regained its old name as Romania's leadership began to develop policies more independent of the Soviet Union. The reason for many Transylvanian name changes was to give a more "Romanian-sounding" name to certain settlements, since in many case the original Romanian name was too close to the Hungarian or German one, from which it was derived (usually a simple re-writing of the name according to Romanian phonetics).

Since 1921 
This list enumerates the changes made from 1921 onwards.

Not included are the names of localities in the Banat, in Transylvania, and in Bukovina that were changed from Hungarian and/or German to Romanian immediately after World War I, the names of localities in Northern Transylvania that were changed back to Hungarian from 1940 to 1944, and those of localities in Greater Romania that today no longer form part of Romania, such as Southern Dobrudja and the Bugeac.

Unsorted 
Axiopolis → Cernavodă
Abruttus → Abrud
Ad Mediam → Băile Herculane
Aegyssus → Tulcea
Ampelum → Zlatna
Apulum → Bălgrad → Gyulafehérvár → Alba Iulia
Arrubium → Măcin
Kronstadt → Brașov → Orașul Stalin → Brașov
Bucureșci → București (Bucharest)
Callatis → Mankalya → Mangalia
Carsium → Hârșova
Cibinum → Hermannstadt → Nagyszeben → Sibiu
Dierna → Orșova
Jassy → Yaş → Iași
Marosvásárhely → Târgu Mureș
Napoca → Klausenburg → Kolozsvár → Cluj → Cluj-Napoca
Noviodunum → Isaccea 
Onești → Gheorghe Gheorghiu-Dej (1965) → Onești (1996)
Orasul Stalin – Braşov
Varadinum (Latin) → (Nagy)várad (Magyar) → Varat (Turkish) → Großwardein (German) → Oradea Mare (Romanian) → (1925 shortening) Oradea
Pelendava → Craiova
Porolissum → Zalău
Potaissa → Turda
Temesvár → Tamışvar → Temesvár → Timișoara
Tomis → Constanța
Drobeta → Turnu Severin → Drobeta-Turnu Severin

See also 
 List of renamed populated places in Moldova

References 

Places Whose Names Were Changed
Lists of place names
Places Whose Names Were Changed
Geographical renaming
Names of places in Romania